Bahuleyan Jeyamohan (born 22 April 1962) is an Indian Tamil and Malayalam language writer and literary critic from Nagercoil in the Indian state of Tamil Nadu.

His best-known and most critically acclaimed work is Vishnupuram, a fantasy set as a quest through various schools of Indian philosophy and mythology. In 2014, he started his most ambitious work Venmurasu, a modern renarration of the epic Mahabharata and successfully completed the same, thus creating the world's longest novel ever written.

His other well-known novels include Rubber, Pin Thodarum Nizhalin Kural, Kanyakumari, Kaadu, Pani Manidhan, Eazhaam Ulagam and Kotravai. The early major influences in his life have been the humanitarian thinkers Leo Tolstoy and Mohandas Karamchand Gandhi. Drawing on the strength of his life experiences and extensive travel around India, Jeyamohan is able to re-examine and interpret the essence of India's rich literary and classical traditions.

Born into a Malayali Nair family in the Kanyakumari district that straddles Tamil Nadu and Kerala, Jeyamohan is equally adept in Tamil and Malayalam. However, the bulk of his work has been in Tamil. Jeyamohan's output includes nine novels, ten volumes of short-stories/plays, thirteen literary criticisms, five biographies of writers, six introductions to Indian and Western literature, three volumes on Hindu and Christian philosophy and numerous other translations and collections. He has also written scripts for Malayalam and Tamil movies.

Personal life
Jeyamohan was introduced to Arunmozhi Nangai as a reader and married her in 1991. Their son Ajithan was born in 1993 and daughter Chaitanya in 1997.

Early life
Jeyamohan was born on 22 April 1962 in Thiruvarambu of Kanyakumari District, Tamil Nadu, to S.Bahuleyan Pillai and B.Visalakshi Amma. Bahuleyan Pillai was an accounts clerk in the Arumanai registrar's office. Visalakshi Amma hailed from a family of trade-unionists. Jeyamohan's siblings were an elder brother and a younger sister. Bahuleyan's family followed him around on his work-related transfers to Thiruvattar and Arumanai towns in the Kanyakumari district.

Very early on, Jeyamohan was inspired by his mother to take up writing. Jeyamohan's first publication during schooldays was in Ratnabala, a children's magazine, followed by a host of publications in popular weeklies. After high school, Jeyamohan was pressured by his father to take up commerce and accountancy in college. The suicide of a close friend drove him to drop out of college and constantly travel the country in search of physical and spiritual experience. He supported himself by taking up odd jobs and writing in pulp magazines all the while reading voraciously. He took up a temporary job at the Telephones department in Kasargode where he became close to the Leftist trade union circles. He received many of his formative ideas on historiography and literary narrative during that period.

Visalakshi and Bahuleyan committed suicide within a month of each other in 1984, and this drove Jeyamohan further into an itinerant lifestyle. He met writer Sundara Ramasamy in 1985 who took on the role of a mentor and encouraged him to take up writing seriously. Jeyamohan also got another mentor in the form of Aattoor Ravi Varma who sensitized him to the delicate balance between art and life. In parallel, Jeyamohan was an avid reader of Indian classics and philosophical texts like the Bhagavad Gita.

Politics
Jayamohan supported the Aam Aadmi Party (AAP) party during the 2014 Indian general election.

Career

Fiction & literary criticism
In 1987, the journal Kollippaavai published his poem Kaidhi (The Prisoner). In the same year, Nadhi (The River) was published in Kanaiyazhi with a critical mention from writer Ashoka Mitran. The journal Nigazh published Bodhi, followed by Padugai ('The Riverbed'). Critics heaped praise on Padugai for its evocative narrative that wove together myths and contemporary visuals. Jeyamohan wrote his first full-fledged novel Rubber in 1988 and then re-edited and published it in 1990.

The novel won the Akilan Memorial prize for its path-breaking portrayal of the ecological and sociological impact of rubber cultivation in the South Indian states of Kerala and Tamil Nadu. Jeyamohan's speech at the awards function was well received, and he further developed those ideas in Novel (1990), an exploration of the art form and its ideologies, and Naveena Thamizhilakkiya Arimugam, a comprehensive introduction to modernist Tamil literature.

In 1993, Jeyamohan met Guru Nitya Chaitanya Yati which proved to be a turning point in his spiritual journey. The dialogues with the Guru opened new views into the body of Indian thought, which culminated in his acclaimed work Vishnupuram in 1997. Jeyamohan travelled and witnessed first-hand regional issues, droughts and political problems that underlay issues like Naxalism in tribal areas. His experiences convinced him of the continuing relevance of Gandhian idealism and non-violence as the sensible alternative to naked capitalism and militant socialism. The leftist in him had been saddened by the collapse of the Soviet Union in 1991, and a decade long introspection on the nature of power and self-righteousness found expression in Pin Thodarum Nizhalin Kural in 1999.

Post-2000, Jeyamohan broke new ground with Kaadu (2003), an exploration of the forest landscape as a metaphor for lust and the vigour of life. Kotravai (2005), the renarration of the Kannagi epic, was deemed by the writer and critics as his best yet in terms of structure and depth.

From 1998 to 2004, Jeyamohan and his friends edited a literary journal named Solputhithu. In 2009, his readership circle created the 'Vishnupuram Ilakkiya Vattam' to broaden the readership for serious literature in Tamil Nadu and to reward under-recognized pioneers of Tamil literature.

When he turned 50, Jeyamohan wrote a set of short-stories, titled 'Aram', that explored the values and idealism that is possible in man. In 2014, Jeyamohan began writing Venmurasu, a re-narration of the Indian epic Mahabharata.

In parallel, Jeyamohan has produced a prolific output as one of the foremost Literary critics and theorists of modern Indian literature with focus on Tamil. His 30 volumes on criticism and anthologies have earned him a respectable place among critics like Vedasagayakumar.

In 2013, he was considered as Tamil Author of the year by National Library, Singapore. In 2016, he worked as Writer in residence for 2 months at Nanyang Technological University, Singapore, organized by National Arts Council (Singapore) and National Institute of Education.

Website
Jeyamohan had been an active participant in Tamil internet discussion groups like Mayyam, Forumhub and Thinnai.com during the early years of the medium in India. As part of the debates, Jeyamohan produced some of his best essays on literary standards and criticism during this period. Recognizing the possibility of losing some of these important works, Jeyamohan's friend and writer Cyril Alex created the author's website for consolidating the author's works. Over the decade, the website has become an important repository of the author's essays running into thousands.

Gandhian movements & Anna Hazare
Jeyamohan gravitated towards Gandhian philosophy and political principles through debates with many intellectuals of the era. His considerable writing resulted in the corpus of essays published in 2009 as Indraya Gandhi, a collection that examined the continuing relevance of Gandhi's methods and ideals in modern India. Indraya Gandhi explored new dimensions on Gandhi's life including his relationship with Nehru, Ambedkar and Dalit politics and the topic of Lust. Jeyamohan has continued to highlight many Gandhians who represent the philosophy.

As a part of the series, he sought to explain how the next generation of Gandhian leaders like Anna Hazare were continuing to inspire the nation towards achieving true democracy and equality. Jeyamohan had been one of the first Indian ideologues to write about Anna Hazare many years before Anna Hazare's popular anti-graft movement. Jeyamohan had personally visited Ralegaon Siddhi to see Hazare's social movements in action, and he also wrote about Hazare's tireless struggle to get the Right to Information Act passed in the Indian parliament.

Throughout 2011, Jeyamohan continued to write about and support Anna Hazare's anti-corruption movement and the Jan Lokpal bill. Rather than focus on the minutiae of the bill itself, Jeyamohan focused readers' attention on the ideology behind Hazare's actions – how he appealed directly to the sense of justice in the common man, his symbolism, and the Gandhian method of achieving the ultimate goal through civil non-violent mass movement without letting up any opportunity to discuss and negotiate with political opponents. Amidst widespread scepticism and slander flamed up by the national and regional media across the political spectrum, Jeyamohan remained rock solid in support of Anna Hazare's movement. By the end of the summer of 2011, Jeyamohan had written close to 60 essays on the topic, many of them in answer to readers who had written in expressing their own doubts and questions. In 2016, on the occasion of state elections in Tamil Nadu, Jeyamohan wrote a series of essays on Democracy in the newspaper Dinamalar which was published as a book.

Environmentalism
Jeyamohan's works like 'Kaadu' and 'Mathagam' feature elephants in central roles, while his biographical and travel essays capture the centrality of nature, ecology and conservation to the Indian way of life. One such true-life story on the conservationist Dr.V. Krishnamurthy (veterinarian) ('Dr K, the Elephant Doctor') sparked huge interest and discussion among readers on the impact of humans on forest life. Told in semi-fictional form as through the eyes of a forest ranger, the story follows Dr K as, despite having a giant reputation in the naturalist circles, he eschews human accolades and seeks a much more rewarding life in the company of animals in the Indian Forest Department's elephant camps. 'The Elephant Doctor' has been included in the Tamil textbook published by the Department of School Education, Tamil Nadu as part of the revised syllabus for the year 2018.

Controversies
In early 2008, Jeyamohan reportedly made crude remarks on Tamil movie icons M G Ramachandran and Sivaji Ganesan which was published by popular print weekly, Ananda Vikatan. The South Indian Cine Artistes' Association passed a resolution demanding that both the publication and the writer apologize for publishing the derogatory article. Later, Ananda Vikatan apologized for posting the article. All segments of society strongly opposed these statements. Fans and followers of MGR fasted on March 1, 2008, in defiance of the remarks made. The Nadigar Sangam has also published a statement saying that the author should be reprimanded.

Jeyamohan claimed in 2014 that many female writers received credit not for their literary talent but rather due to their gender as women. He was criticized for his statements. Women authors and campaigners stated his views reflected his "misogynist" attitude toward women.

Jeyamohan was assaulted by a shop keeper in 2019 in Kanyakumari district for a dispute over spoilt idli batter. According to The Hindu, the police reported that a female store staff refused to take the batter back from Jeyamohan after Jeyamohan claimed it to be spoilt. Following this, Jeyamohan allegedly threw the batter packets at the shop. The escalation led the grocer, a DMK functionary, allegedly assaulting the writer. The grocer was arrested. Jeyamohan stated that the case was delayed due to political pressure from the Bharatiya Janata Party (BJP), not the DMK, because the grocers's brother was a BJP functionary.

Awards
 Akilan Memorial Prize (1990)
 Katha Samman (1992)
 Sanskriti Sammaan (1994)
 Paavalar Virudhu from Isaignani Ilayaraja Ilakkiya Peravai (2008)
 Mugam award for 'Aram' collection
 Fiction award for 'Kotravai' from The Tamil Literary Garden (2009)
 Kerala Film Critics Association award for Best Scriptwriter for Ozhimuri (2012)
 T A Shahid Memorial award (2012) for Best Scriptwriter for Ozhimuri
 Kannadhasan award from Kovai Kannadasan Kazhagam (2014)
 Iyal award from The Tamil Literary Garden for 2014 (presented 2015)
 Refused to accept the Padmashri award from Government of India (2016) on the grounds preserving his integrity
 A translation of his short story (Periyamma's words) was awarded 2017 Close Approximations Fiction Prize from critically acclaimed Asymptote
 Lifetime achievement award, Codissia Book Festival (Coimbatore) – 2017

Bibliography

Fiction
Novels
 Rubber (1990)
 Vishnupuram (1997)
 Pin Thodarum Nizhalin Kural (1999), inspired by the rise and fall of Nikolai Bukharin, a contemporary examination of power, purpose and morals/righteousness
 Kanyakumari (2000)
 Kaadu (2003) (translated into English as The Forest by Janaki Venkatraman)
 Eazhaam Ulagam (2003)
 Anal Kaatru (2009)
 Iravu (2010)
 Ulogam (2010), The Metal, analysing the psyche of an assassin
 Kanninilam
 Vellai Yanai (2013) – Fictionalized account of first labor movement of India in the backdrop of Casteism, British Rule and the Madras Famine
 Ashokavanam (in progress)

Epics
 Kotravai (2005) – The Goddess of the Paalai land, a re-interpretation of the Tamil epic Silappadhikaram
 Venmurasu – Novel series based on Mahabharata
 Mudharkanal – Published online January–February 2014
 Mazhaippadal – Published online March–May 2014 
 Vannkkadal – Published online June to August 2014. 
 Neelam – Published online August to September 2014
 Prayagai – Published online October 2014 to January 2015
 Venmugil Nagaram – Published online February to May 2015
 Indraneelam – Published online June to August 2015
 Kaandeepam – Published online September to November 2015
 Veiyon – Published online December 2015 to early March 2016
 Panniru Padaikkalam – Published online March 2016, to June 2016
 Solvalar Kaadu – Published online July 2016 to September 2016
 Kiratham – Published online October 2016 to January 2017
 Maamalar – Published online February 2017 to May 2017
 Neerkolam – Published online May 2017 to August 2017
 Ezhuthazhal – Published online September 2017 to December 2017
 Kuruthichaaral – Published online December 2017 to March 2018
 Imaikkanam – Published online March 2018 to May 2018
 Sennaa Vaengai – Published online from June 2018 to August 2018
 Thisaither Vellam – Published online from Sept 2018 to Nov 2018
 Kaarkadal – Published online from Dec 2018 to March 2019
 Irutkani – Published online from April 2019 to June 2019
 Theein Edai – Published online from April 2019 to June 2019
 Neerchudar – Published online from July 2019 to August 2019
 kalitriyaanai Nirai – Published online from December 2019 to February 2020
 kalporu sirunurai – Published online from March 2020 to June 2020
 Muthalaavin – Published online from 1 July 2020 to 2 July 2020
Short Story Collections
 Thisaigalin Naduvey (1992)
 Mann (1993)
 Aayirangaal Mandabam (1998)
 Koondhal (2003)
 Jeyamohan Sirukathaigal (2004)
 Jeyamohan Kurunovelgal (2004), Novellas
 Nizhalvelikkadhaigal (2005), also titled as Devadhaikadhaigalum Peikkadhaigalum
 Visumbu (2006), science fiction stories
 Oomaichennaai (2008)
 Aram (2011)
 Eeraaru Kaalkondezhum Puravi
 Venkadal

Plays
 Vadakkumugam (2004)

Children's literature
 Pani Manidhan (2002), The Ice Man (Yeti)

Non-fiction
Literary criticism
 Novel (1992)
 Tharkaala Malayala Kavidhaigal (1992), on contemporary Malayalam poetry
 Asokamithran Arubathandu Niraivuvizha malar (1993), souvenir volume for writer Asokamithran's sixtieth birthday celebrations
 Sundara Ramasami Niraivuvizha malar (1994), souvenir volume for writer Sundara Ramasami's sixtieth birthday celebrations
 Naveena Thamizhilakkiya Arimugam (1998), an introduction to modern Tamil literature
 Naveenathuvathirku pin Thamizh kavidhai (1999), Post-modern Tamil poetry, with focus on Poet Devadevan
 Sanga Chittirangal, vignettes from Tamil Sangam poems
 Munsuvadugal
 Merku Chaalaram, introduction to Western literature
 Indraya Malayala Kavidhaigal (2002), on contemporary Malayalam poetry
 Nedumpathaiyoram (2002), translated compilation of editorials originally published in the Malayalam publications Mathrubhumi and Bashaboshini
 Ilakkiya Munnodigal Varisai (2003), a collection of seven volumes on pioneering modern Tamil litterateurs
 Ullunarvin Thadathil (2004)
 Samakaala Malayala Kavidhaigal (2005), on contemporary Malayalam poetry
 Ilakkiya Uraiyaadalgal Pettigal (2005), interviews and dialogues with modern Tamil writers
 Aazhnathiyai Thedi (2006)
 Eezha Ilakkiyam Oru Vimarsana Paarvai (2006), criticism of Eelam literature
 Kanneerai Pinthodardhal (2006) – Following the trail of tears, a review of 22 Indian novels
 Kamandala Nadhi – Nanjilnadan Padaippulagam (2007) – on Tamil writer Nanjil Nadan
 Ezhudhum Kalai (2008) – The art of writing
 Puthiya Kaalam (2009)
 Kadaitheruvin Kalaignan (2010) – on Tamil writer A Madhavan
 Pookkum Karuvelam — Poomaniyin Padaippulagam (2011) – on writer Poomani
 Oliyalaanadhu — Devadevanin Padaippulagam (2012) – on poet Devadevan
 Ezhudhiyavanai Kandupidithal — Ilakkiya Vivadha Katturaigal

Philosophy/Spirituality
 Hindu Gnana Marabil Aaru Dharisanangal (2002), the six visions of Hinduism
 Indhiya Gnanam (2008)
 Siluvayin Peyaraal,  In the Name of the Cross, discourse on Jesus Christ the philosopher
 Hindu Madham: Sila Vivadhangal

Politics
 Saatchi Mozhi (2008), discourses on politics
 Indraya Gandhi (2009), treatise on the continuing relevance of Gandhi and Gandhian principles
 Anna Hazare (2011), (Collection of essays describing Anna Hazare's Gandhian philosophy and fight against corruption)

Culture
 Pannpadudhal
 Thannuraigal
 Kodungollur Kannagi (2005), on the cult of Kannagi – translated from Malayalam
 Ethirmugam (2006), collection of debates on the Internet 2000–2006

Memoirs/biographies
 Su.Ra Ninaivin Nathiyil – on his mentor Sundara Ramasami
 Logi (Logithadas Ninaivu) (2008) – on Malayalam filmmaker Lohithadas

Life/experience
 Vaazhvile Oru Murai
 Nigazhdhal Anubavak Kurippugal (2007)
 Je Chaitanyavin Sinthanai Marabu (2007)
 Indru Petravai (2008), Notes from the diary
 Naalum Pozhudhum
 Ivargal Irundhargal
 Purappadu (2013)

Travels
 Pulveli Desam (2008), Grasslands, travels in Australia
 Mugangalin Desam (2017), travels in India

General
 Nalam – essays on health (2008)

Malayalam
 Nedumpathaiyoram (2002)
 Uravidangal Nooru Simhasanangal Aana Doctor Film/screenwriting
Jeyamohan has collaborated with filmmakers in Tamil and Malayalam and shares credits for story, screenplay and dialogues.

Tamil
 Kasthuri Maan (2005)
 Naan Kadavul (2009)
 Angadi Theru (2010)
 Neerparavai (2012)
 Kadal (2013) 
 6 Mezhuguvarthigal (2013) 
 Kaaviya Thalaivan (2014)
 Papanasam (2015)Yemaali (2018)
 2.0 (2018)
 Sarkar (2018)
 Vendhu Thanindhathu Kaadu (2022)
 Ponniyin Selvan: I (2022)
 Viduthalai (2022)
 Indian 2 (2023)

Malayalam
 Ozhimuri (2012)
 Kaanchi  (2013)
 1 By Two (2014)
 Naku Penda Naku Taka (2014)Motor Cycle Diaries (Pre-Production)

Kannada

 Dhehi'' (2018)

See also
 List of Indian writers
 Nitya Chaitanya Yati
 Sundara Ramaswamy

References

External links
  
 Venmurasu website 
 

People from Nagercoil
People from Kanyakumari district
Tamil-language writers
Indian postmodern writers
Children's writers in Tamil
Living people
Tamil writers
Screenwriters from Tamil Nadu
1962 births
Tamil screenwriters
Malayalam-language writers
Malayalam screenwriters
Novelists from Tamil Nadu